Stadio Omobono Tenni is a football stadium in Treviso, Italy. It is currently the home of Treviso FBC 1993. The stadium was built in 1933 and holds 10,001. After the inauguration in 1933, a friendly match between Treviso FBC and Udinese was held, which was followed by a friendly against the Italy National Team. In the 1940s and 1950s the capacity of the stadium was of 12,000 seats.

History
The stadium was named after Omobono Tenni, a motorcycle road racer who lived in Treviso and fatally died in 1948 in Bern, Switzerland.

On 24 January 1960, the stadium played host to a rugby league international between Italy and Australia. In front of a small crowd of just 3,105 the Kangaroos, playing the 37th and last game of their 1959–60 Kangaroo tour of Great Britain and France, defeated the home side 67–22 to complete a two-game sweep of the Italians to end the Kangaroo Tour on a high note.

The stadium was also temporary home to A.S. Cittadella for at least the 2008–09 Serie B season, until their own stadium, Stadio Pier Cesare Tombolato, was renovated to meet Serie B stadiums criteria.

Stadium distance from:
Train Station: 3 km
Venice Marco Polo Airport: 25 km
Treviso S. Giuseppe Airport: 8 km
Center of Treviso: 0.5 km

References

External links
Stadium picture

Omobono
Omobono Tenni
Omobono Tenni
Sports venues in Veneto